Khel – No Ordinary Game is a 2003 Indian Hindi action film directed by Yusuf Khan. The film stars Sunny Deol, Sunil Shetty and Celina Jaitly in lead roles. Former Indian cricketer Ajay Jadeja makes his Bollywood debut. It was released on 3 October 2003.

Synopsis
Multi-millionaire industrialist Dev Mallya takes a personal interest in an attractive interior designer Saanjh Batra, and wants to marry her. He starts by hiring her to re-do the interior of his palatial home. He makes it a point to be pleasant to her and her mom, Mrs. Kiran Batra. One day Dev finds out that Saanjh has some feelings for his friend, Rohan Potdar, and this knowledge makes him insecure. Shortly after, Rohan is arrested for murder, is tried, and sentenced to life imprisonment. This news breaks Saanjh's heart, and she eventually consents to marry Dev. All is perfect in Dev's world, until ACP Rajvir Scindia announces the re-opening of the case against Rohan Potdar, as he is convinced that Rohan is the victim of a conspiracy.

Cast
Sunny Deol as A.C.P. Rajveer Scindia
Suniel Shetty as Dev Mallya
Ajay Jadeja as Rohan Potdar
Celina Jaitly as Saanjh Batra
Gulshan Grover as Inspector Khushwant Chhadha
Suhasini Mulay as Daadi
Vivek Shauq as Girish Mathur
 Supriya Karnik as Kiran S. Batra, Saanjh's mother.
 Anil Kanyal as Kanyal G.

Music
Music by Daboo Malik, Babbu Mann and Dudes Music Company.
"Kiya Hai Jadu Iss Kadar - Shaan, Shailendra Kumar, S. P. Sailaja
"Sharrata" — Sukhwinder Singh, Babbu Maan
"Chori Chori Mere Dil Ko" - Sunidhi Chauhan, Shaan
"Jadu Sa Mujhpe Chal Raha" - Kumar Sanu, Kavita Krishnamurthy
"Moment Of Love" - S. P. Sailaja
"Tumko Kitna Hai Mujhse Pyar" - Sonu Nigam, Sunidhi Chauhan
"Moment of Passion" - Kumar Sanu

Critical response
Taran Adarsh of IndiaFM gave the film 2 stars out of 5, writing ″On the whole, KHEL is a fair entertainer its target audience being the masses, not critics or multiplex-going audience. At the box-office, the holiday period will help the film take a good start and eventually, it will find patronage in the interiors.″ Anjum N of Rediff.com wrote ″Editor-turned-director Yusuf Khan does a fair job, but is handicapped by a story that has no suspense, twists or unpredictable, manipulative characters. But, having written the story himself, he cannot blame anyone else if his 'ultimate game' fails to take off.″ Manish Gajjar of BBC.com wrote ″In this film, we see Suniel Shetty playing a different character. Its nice to see him in a subdued nature as compared to his usual macho rambo self. Sunny Deol and Ajay Devgan are their usual selves whilst Ajay Jedeja gives a natural performance considering that he is a newcomer. Overall Khel is good escapist cinema which will appeal to the younger generation.″

References

External links

2003 films
2000s Hindi-language films
Films scored by Daboo Malik
Indian action thriller films
2003 action thriller films